Vincent Bigot (15 May 1649, in Bourges – 7 September 1720, in Paris) was a French Jesuit priest and a missionary in Canada.

Life history
Vincent Bigot, like his brother Jacques, was sent to the Algonkin mission at Sillery upon his arrival in Canada in 1680.

Bigot was important to the Jesuit mission in Canada. By 1704 he was superior general of their missions in that jurisdiction. In 1713 he returned to France to become the procurator of Canadian missions. He held this position until his death.

References 
 Biography at the Dictionary of Canadian Biography Online
 Catholic Indian Missions of Canada

1649 births
1720 deaths
17th-century Canadian Jesuits
17th-century French Jesuits
Clergy from Bourges
18th-century Canadian Jesuits
People of New France
18th-century French Jesuits